Zulina Guadalupe Muñoz Grajeda (born 10 August 1987) is a Mexican professional boxer. She held the WBC female super flyweight title from 2012 to 2017 and challenged for the WBC female bantamweight title in 2008. At regional level she held the WBC-NABF female bantamweight title from 2006 to 2007. As of September 2020, she is ranked as the world's third best active female bantamweight by The Ring and fourth by BoxRec.

Professional boxing record

References

External links

Living people
1987 births
Mexican women boxers
Super-flyweight boxers
Bantamweight boxers
World Boxing Council champions
Boxers from the State of Mexico